In mathematics, binary splitting is a technique for speeding up numerical evaluation of many types of series with rational terms. In particular, it can be used to evaluate hypergeometric series at rational points.

Method
Given a series

where pn and qn are integers, the goal of binary splitting is to compute integers P(a, b) and Q(a, b) such that

The splitting consists of setting m = [(a + b)/2] and recursively computing P(a, b) and Q(a, b) from P(a, m), P(m, b), Q(a, m), and Q(m, b). When a and b are sufficiently close, P(a, b) and Q(a, b) can be computed directly from pa...pb and qa...qb.

Comparison with other methods
Binary splitting requires more memory than direct term-by-term summation, but is asymptotically faster since the sizes of all occurring subproducts are reduced. Additionally, whereas the most naive evaluation scheme for a rational series uses a full-precision division for each term in the series, binary splitting requires only one final division at the target precision; this is not only faster, but conveniently eliminates rounding errors. To take full advantage of the scheme, fast multiplication algorithms such as Toom–Cook and Schönhage–Strassen must be used; with ordinary O(n2) multiplication, binary splitting may render no speedup at all or be slower.

Since all subdivisions of the series can be computed independently of each other, binary splitting lends well to parallelization and checkpointing.

In a less specific sense, binary splitting may also refer to any divide and conquer algorithm that always divides the problem in two halves.

References

 Xavier Gourdon & Pascal Sebah. Binary splitting method
 David V. Chudnovsky & Gregory V. Chudnovsky. Computer algebra in the service of mathematical physics and number theory. In Computers and Mathematics (Stanford, CA, 1986), pp. 09–232, Dekker, New York, 1990.
 Bruno Haible, Thomas Papanikolaou. Fast multiprecision evaluation of series of rational numbers. Paper distributed with the CLN library source code.
 Lozier, D.W. and Olver, F.W.J. Numerical Evaluation of Special Functions. Mathematics of Computation 1943–1993: A Half-Century of Computational Mathematics, W.Gautschi, eds., Proc. Sympos. Applied Mathematics, AMS, v.48, pp. 79–125 (1994).
 Bach, E. The complexity of number-theoretic constants. Info. Proc. Letters, N 62, pp. 145–152 (1997).
 Borwein, J.M., Bradley, D.M. and Crandall, R.E. Computational strategies for the Riemann zeta function. J. of Comput. Appl. Math., v.121, N 1-2, pp. 247–296 (2000).
 Karatsuba, E.A. Fast evaluation of transcendental functions. (English. Russian original) Probl. Inf. Transm. 27, No.4, 339-360 (1991); translation from Probl. Peredachi Inf. 27, No.4, 76–99 (1991).
 Ekatherina Karatsuba.  Fast Algorithms and the FEE method

Computer arithmetic algorithms